The first lady or first gentleman of the Philippines is the courtesy title given to the host or hostess of Malacañang Palace, the residence of the head of state and head of government of the Philippines.

The title is traditionally held by the consort of the president of the Philippines, and as such is used to interchangeably refer to the spouse of the incumbent; however, this is rarely the case, especially for presidents without a living spouse at the time of their tenure. The position, which is customary in nature and dignity, merits no official remuneration from the state.

Liza Araneta Marcos is the current first lady of the Philippines, as wife of the 17th and current president of the Philippines, Bongbong Marcos.

Terminology
The host of the Malacañang Palace, who is usually the consort of the president, has been referred to in English as the "first lady" (Filipino: Unang Ginang). As Gloria Macapagal Arroyo took office as the first female president who is not a widow, the masculine form "first gentleman" (abbreviated FG; Filipino: Unang Ginoó) was used for her husband, Jose Miguel Arroyo.

Role
The position of first lady or first gentleman is not an elected position, carries no official duties, and has no personal remuneration. Nonetheless, the title holder participates in humanitarian and charitable work on behalf of the president, often in line with his or her policies and programmes. Furthermore, many of the holders of this post have taken an active role in campaigning for the president, or have participated in public life through some other manner.

Imelda Marcos was given a formal job as Governor of Metro Manila and as Minister of Human Settlements by her husband Ferdinand Marcos during his 21-year rule. She is also the first incumbent first lady to enter politics by winning a seat in the Interim Batasang Pambansa in 1978.

Two former first ladies later won seats in Congress after their husbands' tenures in office. In 1995, Marcos herself became the first former first lady to win a seat in the House of Representatives. In 2001, Loi Ejercito became the first former first lady to win a seat in the Senate.

List

Non-spouses who held the distinction
On a few occasions, individuals who are not spouses of the incumbent president have temporarily performed tasks reserved for the first lady or first gentleman, effectively rendering them as the de facto holder of the position; most often they are a direct relative of the president. To date, only Elpidio Quirino, Corazon Aquino, and Benigno Aquino III had no spouse to assume the title of First Lady or First Gentleman. Rodrigo Duterte did not appoint a first lady despite having Honeylet Avanceña as his common-law wife. In the case of Quirino, his daughter received the title as he was a widower upon his accession.

By president

Elpidio Quirino
Victoria Quirino-Gonzalez was the first lady for her father, Elpidio Quirino. She was made the official host of the Malacañang Palace. However Victoria is regarded as the first to be named with the role of first lady. The spouses of previous presidents, from Emilio Aguinaldo to Manuel Roxas, were not given the title during their respective husbands' terms.

Benigno Aquino III
Benigno Aquino III never married, so the palace hired professionals to manage tasks and duties customarily reserved for the first lady, such as organizing state dinners.

On some occasions, he charged one or more of his sisters with entertaining local and foreign dignitaries. During the 2015 APEC summit hosted in Pasay, his youngest sister, Kris Aquino served as temporary first lady for the event. Their other sisters, Ballsy Aquino-Cruz, Pinky Aquino-Abelleda, and Viel Aquino-Dee, also assisted him in his various duties.

Rodrigo Duterte
 
Prior to his inauguration, incumbent Rodrigo Duterte declared his eldest daughter Sara would be the first lady despite having Honeylet Avanceña as his common-law wife. He was previously married to Elizabeth Zimmerman; their marriage was annulled in 2000.

However, Sara Duterte was already mayor-elect of Davao City, and declined the offer. Following her filing of a 10-day leave of absence until June 22, there were speculations that she did so to assume the role of first lady, but she neither denied or confirmed speculations. Former Department of the Interior and Local Government secretary Rafael Alunan suggested that Vice-President Leni Robredo serve as de facto first lady but this never materialised.

Avanceña nevertheless would fulfill roles usually conducted by the first lady such as during the official visit of Japanese prime minister Shinzo Abe, and the 30th ASEAN Summit in 2017.

Lifespan

See also
 President of the Philippines
 List of presidents of the Philippines
 List of ancient Philippine consorts
 Malacañang Palace
 First lady

Notes

References

First Spouses of the Philippines